"House on Fire" is a song by British singer and songwriter Mimi Webb. It was released on 18 February 2022 through Epic Records as the lead single from her debut studio album Amelia. The song debuted at number six on the UK Singles Chart, making it her highest debut on the chart.

Critical reception
The song was described as a "catchy, self-incriminating song". Taking her previous singles into account, Tomás Mier of Rolling Stone called Webb the "queen of breakups". The "upbeat production" was viewed as the singer showing another side of the singer. Billboard writer Jason Lipshutz included the song on the "10 cool new pop songs" list of the week, saying that "Webb has dropped a wondrous, biting pop track". He also drew comparisons to Canadian singer Tate McRae: by "singing in this tale of heartbroken arson", Webb combines elements of both "a major-key pop refrain and hit a revenge-fantasy pose". In a mixed review, Jenessa Williams of The Guardian awarded the song 3 out of 5 stars, praising her vocal abilities while calling her songs "unimaginative" and sticking to a "well-rehearsed formula".

Commercial performance
In Ireland, Webb earned her highest chart entry with the song so far. Debuting at number six in the United Kingdom on 25 February 2022, she also reached her highest charting song there, surpassing "Good Without", which had previously peaked at number eight in early 2021. In the United States, the song also surpassed "Good Without" as her highest charting effort on Mainstream Top 40, before being later surpassed by "Red Flags".

Music video
The music video was released on 18 February 2022 and was directed by KLVDR. It features shots of Webb setting the house of her ex-boyfriend on fire after he had cheated on her. She is then seen dancing with firefighters and posing next to nurses.

Cover versions
Fellow British singer George Ezra covered the song during a BBC Radio 1 Live Lounge performance, in addition to performing his song "Green Green Grass" on 19 May.

Charts

Weekly charts

Year-end charts

Certifications

References

2022 songs
2022 singles
Epic Records singles
Mimi Webb songs
Songs about infidelity
Songs written by Pablo Bowman
Song recordings produced by Cirkut (record producer)